Dravski Dvor is a settlement in the Municipality of Miklavž na Dravskem Polju in northeastern Slovenia. The area is part of the traditional region of Styria. The municipality is now included in the Drava Statistical Region.

References

External links
Dravski Dvor on Geopedia

Populated places in the Municipality of Miklavž na Dravskem polju